The 2016–17 Kennesaw State Owls women's basketball team represented Kennesaw State University during the 2016–17 NCAA Division I women's basketball season. The Owls, led by first year head coach Agnus Berenato, played their home games at the KSU Convocation Center and were members of the Atlantic Sun Conference. They finished the season 10–20, 8–6 in A-Sun play to finish in fourth place. They advanced to the semifinals of A-Sun Tournament where they lost to Stetson.

Roster

Schedule

|-
!colspan=9 style="background:#000000; color:white;"| Exhibition

|-
!colspan=9 style="background:#000000; color:white;"| Non-conference regular season

|-
!colspan=9 style="background:#000000; color:white;"| Atlantic Sun Conference season

|-
!colspan=9 style="background:#000000; color:white;"| Atlantic Sun Women's Tournament

See also
 2016–17 Kennesaw State Owls men's basketball team

References

Kennesaw State
Kennesaw State Owls women's basketball seasons